Atop of Mount Kenya Senecio keniophytum is one of the endemic groundsel (Senecio) found at high altitudes in Kenya, such as the Afro-alpine zone of Mount Kenya, but not one of the giant Dendrosenecio that also live there.

Description

Leaves and stems A branching plant with tough densely white stems with leaves attached directly to them. Leave edges have teeth and leaf surfaces have green and white hairs on the upper side and a dense matting of white hair and bald midrib on the lower side.
Flowers The radiate flower heads are solitary sometimes two or three together and stand up and flower stalks cottony with hairs.
Roots A horizontal plant with stems that send shoots above and roots below.

Distribution

References

External links

keniophytum